The Ndengereko are an ethnic and linguistic group from southern Pwani Region, Tanzania. Their homeland is north of the Rufiji River in parts of Mkuranga, Kisarawe and Rufiji Districts.  In 2000 the Ndengereko population was estimated to number 110,000.

References

Ethnic groups in Tanzania
Indigenous peoples of East Africa
Kinondoni District